Summit City may refer to one of the following places in the United States:

 A nickname of the city of Fort Wayne, Indiana
 The town of Summit City, California, incorporated into Shasta Lake City
 Summit City, California, former name of Meadow Lake, Nevada County, California
 Summit City School District in Union County, New Jersey
 The original name of the town now called Whitesburg, Kentucky
 Summit City, Michigan, an unincorporated community in rural Grand Traverse County.